The passepied ("pass-foot", from a characteristic dance step) is a French court dance. Originating as a kind of Breton branle, it was adapted to courtly use in the 16th century and is found frequently in 18th-century French opera and ballet, particularly in pastoral scenes, and latterly also in baroque instrumental suites of dances. In English the passepied has been spelled "paspy" as well as "paspie" or "paspe", phonetic approximations of the French pronunciation.

History
The earliest historical mention of the passepied was by Noël du Fail in 1548, who said it was common at Breton courts. François Rabelais and Thoinot Arbeau, writing later in the 16th century, identify the dance as a type of branle characteristic of Brittany. At this time it was a fast duple-time dance with three-bar phrases, therefore of the branle simple type. Like many folk-dances it was popular at the court of Louis XIV.

The passepied was remodelled by Jean-Baptiste Lully as a pastoral concert dance, first appearing in the 1680s as a faster minuet. Its phrasing had to divide into four measures to accommodate the four characteristic tiny steps over two measures. It used the steps of the minuet, which Lully had long before similarly adapted, to quite different effect, moving lightly and tracing elaborate patterns upon the floor.

After this the passepied appeared in a great many theatrical productions, including those of Jean-Philippe Rameau. It is found as late as 1774 in Christoph Willibald Gluck's Iphegenia in Aulis.

Writing in 1739 Johann Mattheson described the passepied as a fast dance, with a character approaching frivolity, for which reason it lacks "the eagerness, anger, or heat expressed by the gigue". Italians often used it as a finale for instrumental sinfonie.

Passepieds occasionally appear in suites such as J.S. Bach's Orchestral Suite No. 1, or dramatic music such as his Overture in the French Style for harpsichord. There are often two Passepieds in minor and major keys to be played in the order I, II, I, or else passepieds occur in contrasting pairs, the first reappearing after the second as a da capo. It also appeared as a movement in Henry Purcell's opera, Dioclesian, and hundreds of other Baroque compositions.

Revivals
Léo Delibes wrote a passepied as part of his incidental music for the play Le roi s'amuse by Victor Hugo. More modern examples include:
The fourth and final movement of Claude Debussy's Suite bergamasque for piano
The third movement of Igor Stravinsky's Symphony in C, which consists of a minuet, passepied, and fugue
The second number in act 2 of Sergei Prokofiev's ballet Cinderella
The first of five dances in the ball scene of Miklós Rózsa's Madame Bovary
The first of five dances in the third movement, "Révérences engrenées, premier pentacle", of Henri Pousseur's Jardinet avec automates for piano
The third movement of Christopher Rouse's orchestral ballet Friandises
The fourth movement of the Garden of the Senses Suite in part 2 of Michael Gandolfi's The Garden of Cosmic Speculation
The 2nd piece of Jean-Michel Blais's 2022 album Aubades

Notes

References
 
 

Footnotes

External links
Video – Baroque passepied from the finale of Lully's Thesee
Video – Passepied de Pécour, chorégraphie by Feuillet, 1709, danced by Laura Brembilla and Bruno Benne
Music video – Passepieds 1 and 2, from Telemann's Recorder Suite in A minor, solo: Moisés Sánchez Ross

Renaissance dance
Renaissance music
Baroque dance
Baroque music
Triple time dances
Dance forms in classical music
French dances